Monica Chang-Fury is a fictional character appearing in American comic books published by Marvel Comics. While originating in the Ultimate Marvel universe in 2009, the Earth-616 version later debuted in 2013.

Fictional character biography
Monica Chang-Fury was created by Mark Millar and Carlos Pacheco, and debuted in Ultimate Comics: Avengers #3 (December 2009) as the second character to use the Black Widow codename in the Ultimate Marvel continuity. She also is the former wife of Nick Fury. They divorced after she found out that he cheated with all her female family members and friends.

An active member of the Avengers' missions and while being contemptuous with Fury and Hawkeye, she assisted in fighting alongside War Machine and Red Wasp against the Red Skull, being the Punisher's wrangler, and repelling a Vampire infestation. Monica later transferred to the New Ultimates alongside Captain America, Iron Man and Thor, and fights against her former teammates who were supposedly selling government secrets to which both teams fight against the conspiracy's manipulator Gregory Stark.

Monica rejoined the Ultimates with Fury as director of S.H.I.E.L.D. again and moved herself and Julius Chang (her and Fury's child) to the Triskelion, alongside Fury, Hawkeye and the Falcon battling the Maker's Children of Tomorrow while a coup d'état occurred in the midst of the chaos. Since a nuclear attack on Washington, D.C. almost killed the whole presidential cabinet, a new "Civil War" erupted. Monica personally helped against Marvin Flumm, resulting in Monica as the new Director of S.H.I.E.L.D. director (one of only four women to serve in the position in any continuity of Marvel), helping alongside political gimmicks to eliminate several terrorist cells of Hydra, and stopping a corrupt politician's conspiracy.

Because of Galactus's destructive abilities, Monica gets cited in court. However, Monica acts as Jessica Drew's contact involving Crossbones's capture as Monica's last chance to bring down Roxxon, wishing her successor as Black Widow well. While working with the FBI, Monica apparently is killed by Green Goblin.

Other versions
Monica Chang makes her first appearance in Marvel's mainstream Earth-616 continuity in the Avengers A.I. series. This version is the chief of S.H.I.E.L.D.'s A.I. Division, and is a devout Muslim. Monica enlists Hank Pym to help her stop Dimitrios (which evolved from the fail-safe virus used to defeat Ultron) and they form the Avengers A.I. consisting of a Doombot, Victor Mancha and the Vision. During their first mission, the Avengers A.I. faced hijacked S.H.I.E.L.D. Drones which attacked a hospital in Atlanta. She later prevents the end of the universe by preventing the execution of an LMD infected with a virus.

In other media
 An amalgamated version of Monica Chang and Black Widow 2099 named Layla appears in the Avengers Assemble episode "Into the Future", voiced by Jennifer Hale. This version is a resistance fighter from a possible future ruled by Kang the Conqueror.

See also
 List of Black Widow characters

References

Comics characters introduced in 2009
Black Widow (Marvel Comics)
Muslim characters in comics
Fictional Asian-American people
Fictional American secret agents
Fictional characters with slowed ageing
Fictional female secret agents and spies
S.H.I.E.L.D. agents
Ultimate Marvel characters
Characters created by Mark Millar
Muslim superheroes
Marvel Comics female superheroes